In Arizona, the Chino Valley Unified School District #51 serves the town of Chino Valley. It operates Chino Valley High School, Heritage Middle School, Del Rio Elementary School, and Territorial Elementary School.

References

External links
 

School districts in Yavapai County, Arizona
Educational institutions with year of establishment missing